The 1984–85 Utah Jazz season was future all-time NBA assist leader John Stockton's first in the NBA. The Jazz selected Stockton with the 16th overall pick in the 1984 NBA Draft.

Draft picks

Roster

Regular season

Season standings

Record vs. opponents

Game log

Regular season

|- align="center" bgcolor="#ffcccc"
| 1
| October 26
| @ Seattle
| L 94–102
|
|
|
| Kingdome
| 0–1
|- align="center" bgcolor="#ffcccc"
| 2
| October 27
| L.A. Clippers
| L 94–103
|
|
|
| Salt Palace
| 0–2
|- align="center" bgcolor="#ccffcc"
| 3
| October 30
| New York
| W 117–111
|
|
|
| Salt Palace
| 1–2

|- align="center" bgcolor="#ccffcc"
| 4
| November 2
| Seattle
| W 107–101
|
|
|
| Thomas & Mack Center
| 2–2
|- align="center" bgcolor="#ffcccc"
| 5
| November 3
| @ Golden State
| L 107–112
|
|
|
| Oakland–Alameda County Coliseum Arena
| 2–3
|- align="center" bgcolor="#ccffcc"
| 6
| November 7
| San Antonio
| W 136–124
|
|
|
| Salt Palace
| 3–3
|- align="center" bgcolor="#ccffcc"
| 7
| November 9
| Golden State
| W 125–117 (OT)
|
|
|
| Salt Palace
| 4–3
|- align="center" bgcolor="#ffcccc"
| 8
| November 10
| @ Denver
| L 135–147
|
|
|
| McNichols Sports Arena
| 4–4
|- align="center" bgcolor="#ccffcc"
| 9
| November 12
| Dallas
| W 123–97
|
|
|
| Salt Palace
| 5–4
|- align="center" bgcolor="#ffcccc"
| 10
| November 15
| @ Portland
| L 120–129
|
|
|
| Memorial Coliseum
| 5–5
|- align="center" bgcolor="#ccffcc"
| 11
| November 17
| Phoenix
| W 108–94
|
|
|
| Salt Palace
| 6–5
|- align="center" bgcolor="#ffcccc"
| 12
| November 20
| @ Kansas City
| L 122–129
|
|
|
| Kemper Arena
| 6–6
|- align="center" bgcolor="#ffcccc"
| 13
| November 21
| @ Atlanta
| L 90–112
|
|
|
| Lakefront Arena
| 6–7
|- align="center" bgcolor="#ccffcc"
| 14
| November 23
| Houston
| W 111–98
|
|
|
| Salt Palace
| 7–7
|- align="center" bgcolor="#ccffcc"
| 15
| November 24
| @ San Antonio
| W 123–117
|
|
|
| HemisFair Arena
| 8–7
|- align="center" bgcolor="#ffcccc"
| 16
| November 27
| @ Phoenix
| L 102–115
|
|
|
| Arizona Veterans Memorial Coliseum
| 8–8
|- align="center" bgcolor="#ffcccc"
| 17
| November 28, 19847:30p.m. MST
| L.A. Lakers
| L 109–114
| Griffith (23)
| Eaton (11)
| Hansen (9)
| Salt Palace Acord Arena11,331
| 8–9
|- align="center" bgcolor="#ccffcc"
| 18
| November 30
| Denver
| W 116–97
|
|
|
| Salt Palace
| 9–9

|- align="center" bgcolor="#ffcccc"
| 19
| December 1
| @ Denver
| L 111–118
|
|
|
| McNichols Sports Arena
| 9–10
|- align="center" bgcolor="#ccffcc"
| 20
| December 4
| @ Golden State
| W 107–105
|
|
|
| Oakland–Alameda County Coliseum Arena
| 10–10
|- align="center" bgcolor="#ffcccc"
| 21
| December 6
| Seattle
| L 99–106
|
|
|
| Salt Palace
| 10–11
|- align="center" bgcolor="#ccffcc"
| 22
| December 9
| Kansas City
| W 123–120
|
|
|
| Thomas & Mack Center
| 11–11
|- align="center" bgcolor="#ccffcc"
| 23
| December 11
| @ Washington
| W 85–82
|
|
|
| Capital Centre
| 11–12
|- align="center" bgcolor="#ffcccc"
| 24
| December 13
| @ New York
| L 115–119 (OT)
|
|
|
| Madison Square Garden
| 12–12
|- align="center" bgcolor="#ffcccc"
| 25
| December 14
| @ Boston
| L 106–117
|
|
|
| Boston Garden
| 12–13
|- align="center" bgcolor="#ffcccc"
| 26
| December 16
| @ Milwaukee
| L 102–115
|
|
|
| MECCA Arena
| 12–14
|- align="center" bgcolor="#ffcccc"
| 27
| December 18
| @ Indiana
| L 81–88
|
|
|
| Market Square Arena
| 12–15
|- align="center" bgcolor="#ccffcc"
| 28
| December 20
| Detroit
| W 117–116
|
|
|
| Salt Palace
| 13–15
|- align="center" bgcolor="#ffcccc"
| 29
| December 22
| Dallas
| L 96–113
|
|
|
| Salt Palace
| 13–16
|- align="center" bgcolor="#ccffcc"
| 30
| December 26
| Kansas City
| W 133–122
|
|
|
| Salt Palace
| 14–16
|- align="center" bgcolor="#ffcccc"
| 31
| December 28
| Philadelphia
| L 111–114
|
|
|
| Salt Palace
| 14–17
|- align="center" bgcolor="#ccffcc"
| 32
| December 29
| @ Dallas
| W 99–97
|
|
|
| Reunion Arena
| 15–17

|- align="center" bgcolor="#ffcccc"
| 33
| January 1
| Indiana
| L 117–119
|
|
|
| Salt Palace
| 15–18
|- align="center" bgcolor="#ccffcc"
| 34
| January 4
| Denver
| W 118–108
|
|
|
| Salt Palace
| 16–18
|- align="center" bgcolor="#ccffcc"
| 35
| January 6
| Houston
| W 121–92
|
|
|
| Salt Palace
| 17–18
|- align="center" bgcolor="#ffcccc"
| 36
| January 7
| @ L.A. Clippers
| L 106–116
|
|
|
| Los Angeles Memorial Sports Arena
| 17–19
|- align="center" bgcolor="#ffcccc"
| 37
| January 10, 19858:30p.m. MST
| @ L.A. Lakers
| L 112–120
| Dantley (34)
| Eaton (11)
| Green (10)
| The Forum14,547
| 17–20
|- align="center" bgcolor="#ffcccc"
| 38
| January 12
| @ Phoenix
| L 94–109
|
|
|
| Arizona Veterans Memorial Coliseum
| 17–21
|- align="center" bgcolor="#ffcccc"
| 39
| January 15
| @ San Antonio
| L 101–121
|
|
|
| HemisFair Arena
| 17–22
|- align="center" bgcolor="#ffcccc"
| 40
| January 16
| Washington
| L 101–103
|
|
|
| Salt Palace
| 17–23
|- align="center" bgcolor="#ccffcc"
| 41
| January 18
| Portland
| W 128–120
|
|
|
| Salt Palace
| 18–23
|- align="center" bgcolor="#ffcccc"
| 42
| January 19
| @ Houston
| L 115–119
|
|
|
| The Summit
| 18–24
|- align="center" bgcolor="#ccffcc"
| 43
| January 22
| New Jersey
| W 102–99
|
|
|
| Salt Palace
| 19–24
|- align="center" bgcolor="#ffcccc"
| 44
| January 24
| Cleveland
| L 109–110
|
|
|
| Salt Palace
| 19–25
|- align="center" bgcolor="#ccffcc"
| 45
| January 26, 19857:30p.m. MST
| L.A. Lakers
| W 96–83
| Dantley (31)
| Eaton (10)
| Green (8)
| Salt Palace Acord Arena12,675
| 20–25
|- align="center" bgcolor="#ffcccc"
| 46
| January 28
| Denver
| L 100–104
|
|
|
| Salt Palace
| 20–26

|- align="center" bgcolor="#ccffcc"
| 47
| February 1
| @ Dallas
| W 121–109
|
|
|
| Reunion Arena
| 21–26
|- align="center" bgcolor="#ccffcc"
| 48
| February 2
| San Antonio
| W 105–104
|
|
|
| Salt Palace
| 22–26
|- align="center" bgcolor="#ffcccc"
| 49
| February 5
| @ Portland
| L 106–126
|
|
|
| Memorial Coliseum
| 22–27
|- align="center" bgcolor="#ccffcc"
| 50
| February 7
| @ Kansas City
| W 114–96
|
|
|
| Kemper Arena
| 23–27
|- align="center" bgcolor="#ccffcc"
| 51
| February 12
| @ Golden State
| W 122–110
|
|
|
| Oakland–Alameda County Coliseum Arena
| 24–28
|- align="center" bgcolor="#ffcccc"
| 52
| February 13
| Atlanta
| L 88–94
|
|
|
| Salt Palace
| 24–28
|- align="center" bgcolor="#ccffcc"
| 53
| February 15
| L.A. Clippers
| W 109–100
|
|
|
| Salt Palace
| 25–28
|- align="center" bgcolor="#ffcccc"
| 54
| February 18
| Boston
| L 94–110
|
|
|
| Salt Palace
| 25–29
|- align="center" bgcolor="#ccffcc"
| 55
| February 20
| @ New Jersey
| W 110–104 (OT)
|
|
|
| Brendan Byrne Arena
| 26–29
|- align="center" bgcolor="#ccffcc"
| 56
| February 22
| @ Cleveland
| W 102–98
|
|
|
| Richfield Coliseum
| 27–29
|- align="center" bgcolor="#ffcccc"
| 57
| February 24
| @ Philadelphia
| L 108–117
|
|
|
| The Spectrum
| 27–30
|- align="center" bgcolor="#ccffcc"
| 58
| February 26
| @ Dallas
| W 103–96
|
|
|
| Reunion Arena
| 28–30
|- align="center" bgcolor="#ffcccc"
| 59
| February 27
| Milwaukee
| L 100–119
|
|
|
| Salt Palace
| 28–31

|- align="center" bgcolor="#ffcccc"
| 60
| March 1
| Houston
| L 115–119
|
|
|
| Salt Palace
| 28–32
|- align="center" bgcolor="#ffcccc"
| 61
| March 3
| @ Portland
| L 93–121
|
|
|
| Memorial Coliseum
| 28–33
|- align="center" bgcolor="#ccffcc"
| 62
| March 6
| @ Houston
| W 94–90
|
|
|
| The Summit
| 29–33
|- align="center" bgcolor="#ccffcc"
| 63
| March 7
| @ Detroit
| W 122–114
|
|
|
| Cobo Arena
| 30–33
|- align="center" bgcolor="#ccffcc"
| 64
| March 9
| @ Chicago
| W 111–105
|
|
|
| Chicago Stadium
| 31–33
|- align="center" bgcolor="#ffcccc"
| 65
| March 12, 19858:30p.m. MST
| @ L.A. Lakers
| L 108–123
| Griffith (24)
| Eaton (11)
| Stockton (9)
| The Forum17,505
| 32–33
|- align="center" bgcolor="#ffcccc"
| 66
| March 13, 19857:30p.m. MST
| L.A. Lakers
| L 105–120
| Roberts (24)
| Bailey (11)
| Stockton (8)
| Salt Palace Acord Arena10,158
| 32–34
|- align="center" bgcolor="#ccffcc"
| 67
| March 15
| Kansas City
| W 115–112
|
|
|
| Salt Palace
| 32–35
|- align="center" bgcolor="#ffcccc"
| 68
| March 17
| @ Kansas City
| L 101–107
|
|
|
| Kemper Arena
| 32–36
|- align="center" bgcolor="#ccffcc"
| 69
| March 18
| Golden State
| W 136–125
|
|
|
| Salt Palace
| 33–36
|- align="center" bgcolor="#ffcccc"
| 70
| March 20
| @ L.A. Clippers
| L 110–121
|
|
|
| Los Angeles Memorial Sports Arena
| 33–37
|- align="center" bgcolor="#ccffcc"
| 71
| March 22
| @ Seattle
| W 110–85
|
|
|
| Kingdome
| 34–37
|- align="center" bgcolor="#ccffcc"
| 72
| March 24
| Chicago
| W 110–92
|
|
|
| Salt Palace
| 34–38
|- align="center" bgcolor="#ffcccc"
| 73
| March 26
| @ Denver
| L 89–104
|
|
|
| McNichols Sports Arena
| 35–38
|- align="center" bgcolor="#ccffcc"
| 74
| March 27
| Dallas
| W 116–101
|
|
|
| Salt Palace
| 36–38
|- align="center" bgcolor="#ccffcc"
| 75
| March 29
| San Antonio
| W 114–109
|
|
|
| Salt Palace
| 37–38
|- align="center" bgcolor="#ffcccc"
| 76
| March 30
| @ Houston
| L 96–106
|
|
|
| The Summit
| 37–39

|- align="center" bgcolor="#ffcccc"
| 77
| April 4
| Seattle
| L 94–102
|
|
|
| Salt Palace
| 37–40
|- align="center" bgcolor="#ccffcc"
| 78
| April 6
| Phoenix
| W 105–94
|
|
|
| Salt Palace
| 38–40
|- align="center" bgcolor="#ccffcc"
| 79
| April 9
| L.A. Clippers
| W 123–104
|
|
|
| Salt Palace
| 39–40
|- align="center" bgcolor="#ccffcc"
| 80
| April 11
| Portland
| W 145–107
|
|
|
| Salt Palace
| 40–40
|- align="center" bgcolor="#ffcccc"
| 81
| April 12
| @ Phoenix
| L 92–96
|
|
|
| Arizona Veterans Memorial Coliseum
| 40–41
|- align="center" bgcolor="#ccffcc"
| 82
| April 14
| @ San Antonio
| W 104–102
|
|
|
| HemisFair Arena
| 41–41

Playoffs

|- align="center" bgcolor="#ccffcc"
| 1
| April 19
| @ Houston
| W 115–101
| Adrian Dantley (34)
| Thurl Bailey (10)
| Rickey Green (10)
| The Summit13,185
| 1–0
|- align="center" bgcolor="#ffcccc"
| 2
| April 21
| @ Houston
| L 96–122
| Jeff Wilkins (22)
| Jeff Wilkins (12)
| Green, Stockton (6)
| The Summit14,139
| 1–1
|- align="center" bgcolor="#ccffcc"
| 3
| April 24
| Houston
| W 112–104
| Adrian Dantley (29)
| Bailey, Stockton (11)
| Rickey Green (10)
| Salt Palace12,316
| 2–1
|- align="center" bgcolor="#ffcccc"
| 4
| April 26
| Houston
| L 94–96
| Rickey Green (22)
| Thurl Bailey (12)
| Rickey Green (11)
| Salt Palace12,690
| 2–2
|- align="center" bgcolor="#ccffcc"
| 5
| April 28
| @ Houston
| W 104–97
| Adrian Dantley (25)
| Mark Eaton (10)
| Rickey Green (6)
| The Summit16,016
| 3–2
|-

|- align="center" bgcolor="#ffcccc"
| 1
| April 30
| @ Denver
| L 113–130
| Adrian Dantley (28)
| Dantley, Kelley (9)
| Rickey Green (6)
| McNichols Sports Arena11,918
| 0–1
|- align="center" bgcolor="#ffcccc"
| 2
| May 2
| @ Denver
| L 123–131 (OT)
| Rickey Green (25)
| Adrian Dantley (14)
| Rickey Green (10)
| McNichols Sports Arena16,317
| 0–2
|- align="center" bgcolor="#ccffcc"
| 3
| May 4
| Denver
| W 131–123
| Adrian Dantley (32)
| Thurl Bailey (14)
| Rickey Green (7)
| Salt Palace12,178
| 1–2
|- align="center" bgcolor="#ffcccc"
| 4
| May 5
| Denver
| L 118–125
| Adrian Dantley (33)
| Rich Kelley (8)
| John Stockton (10)
| Salt Palace12,716
| 1–3
|- align="center" bgcolor="#ffcccc"
| 5
| May 7
| @ Denver
| L 104–116
| Rickey Green (22)
| Rich Kelley (11)
| Rickey Green (7)
| McNichols Sports Arena17,022
| 1–4
|-

Player statistics

Season

Playoffs

Awards and records

Awards
 Mark Eaton, NBA Defensive Player of the Year Award
 Mark Eaton, NBA All-Defensive First Team

Records

Transactions

Trades

Free agents

Additions

Subtractions

See also
 1985–86 Utah Jazz season
 1984–85 NBA season

References

Utah Jazz seasons
U
Utah Jazz
Utah Jazz